Promises in the Dark is a 1979 American drama film directed by Jerome Hellman and written by Loring Mandel. The film stars Marsha Mason, Ned Beatty, Susan Clark, Michael Brandon, Kathleen Beller and Paul Clemens. It was released by Warner Bros. and Orion Pictures on November 2, 1979.

For their performances, Marsha Mason earned a nomination for Best Performance in a Motion Picture – Drama and Kathleen Beller received a nomination for Best Supporting Performance in a Motion Picture – Drama, Comedy or Musicals at the 37th Golden Globe Awards. Mason was also nominated that same year for the Best Performance in a Motion Picture – Comedy or Musical Golden Globe award for her work in Chapter Two.

Plot
Numbed by career demands and a recent divorce, Dr. Alexandra Kendall hides behind a hard shell of professional detachment. Then she treats Buffy Koenig, a dying 17-year-old cancer patient who reawakens Kendall to life's possibilities. Eventually, Buffy's deteriorating condition forces Dr. Kendall to weigh the consequences of keeping a promise that she had made.

Cast

Production
Writer Loring Mandel conceived the story for Promises in the Dark while he was employed as head writer for the daytime drama Love of Life. When the soap's executive producer Darryl Hickman rejected the idea, Mandel quit the show and developed the plot into a feature screenplay.

The project was initially in development at United Artists, with Elizabeth Ashley cast in the starring role, John Schlesinger set to direct and Arnold Schulman and Jerome Hellman producing. However, with the exception of Hellman, no one remained with the project, which was inactive for many years. Arthur Krim, chairman of the newly formed Orion Pictures, selected the script as one of the company’s first projects on the strength of Hellman’s previous productions, such as Midnight Cowboy and Coming Home. In addition to serving as producer, Hellman directed the film.

References

External links 
 
 
 
 

1979 films
Warner Bros. films
American drama films
1979 drama films
Films scored by Leonard Rosenman
1970s English-language films
1970s American films
Films shot in Connecticut
Films set in Connecticut